Emily Cherotich Tuei (born 13 May 1986) is a Kenyan middle-distance runner. She competed in the women's 800 metres at the 2017 World Championships in Athletics.

In June 2021, she qualified to represent Kenya at the 2020 Summer Olympics.

References

External links

1986 births
Living people
Kenyan female middle-distance runners
World Athletics Championships athletes for Kenya
Place of birth missing (living people)
Athletes (track and field) at the 2018 Commonwealth Games
Commonwealth Games competitors for Kenya
Athletes (track and field) at the 2020 Summer Olympics
Olympic athletes of Kenya